Molo Church, also known as Saint Anne Parish Church, is a neogothic Roman Catholic church located in the district of Molo in Iloilo City, Iloilo, in the Philippines. The church is recognized as "the women's church" or "the feminist church" because it only features images of female saints inside, including Saint Anne, the patron saint of Molo. The National Historical Institute declared it a national landmark in 1992.

History 
Molo Church was constructed in 1831 under Fray Pablo Montaño. Originally made of tabique pampango with a chalk roof. Plans for a concrete structure were drawn up in 1866, approved by Bishop Mariano Cuartero in 1869, and completed in 1888 by Fray Agapito Buenaflor under Don Jose Manuel Locsin's supervision. In honor of Saint Anne, the church is known as a feminist church because of its two rows of sixteen female saints on both sides of the altar. Molo Church was visited by Dr. Jose Rizal on August 4, 1886, because of its biblical paintings, which can no longer be seen in the church. It served as an evacuation center for civilians during World War II. The church was damaged and one tower was destroyed on March 18, 1945, during the liberation of the Philippines from Japan. The church was later repaired by Rev. Manuel Alba with the help of the congregation.

The church was declared a national landmark by the National Historical Institute in 1992 through the representation of Sir Knight Rex S. Salvilla. It is the only Gothic church in the country outside of Manila.

Architecture 
The façade of the church is made of rough stone that highlights the Gothic-Renaissance elements seen in the structure, with its two towers that have numerous spires and pointed arches. The church has three naves with sixteen statues of female saints inside. These saints are Saint Marcella, Saint Apollonia, Saint Genevieve, Saint Isabelle, Saint Felicity, Saint Agnes, Saint Monica, Saint Magdalene, Saint Juliana, Saint Lucy, Saint Rose, Saint Teresa, Saint Clare, Saint Cecilia, Saint Margaret, and Saint Martha. The church's patroness, Saint Anne, is housed in the retablo, along with statues of the Blessed Virgin and the Holy Trinity.

Gallery

References

External links 

Roman Catholic churches in Iloilo
Spanish Colonial architecture in the Philippines
Buildings and structures in Iloilo City
Tourist attractions in Iloilo City
Gothic Revival church buildings in the Philippines
Churches in the Roman Catholic Archdiocese of Jaro